Craig McMorris (born December 14, 1991) is a Canadian professional snowboarder and analyst from Regina, Saskatchewan. He is the older brother of snowboarder Mark McMorris and the son of Saskatchewan provincial politician Don McMorris and his wife, Cindy. 

McMorris has worked as an analyst for the CBC since 2014, providing snowboarding commentary at the 2014 Winter Olympics, 2018 Winter Olympics, and the 2022 Winter Olympics. He served as cultural content for the 2016 Summer Olympics in Rio de Janeiro, and he also worked as a commentator for the CBC at the 2020 Summer Olympics, covering skateboarding in its Olympic debut.

References

External links

Canadian male snowboarders
1991 births
Sportspeople from Regina, Saskatchewan
Living people